Xenocytaea triramosa is a jumping spider.

Name
The epitheton triramosa refers to the three-part retrolateral tibial apophysis (RTA) of the male palp.

Description
Xenocytaea triramosa males are about 4 mm long, with females up to 5.5 mm.

Distribution
Xenocytaea triramosa is only known from Viti Levu, Fiji.

References
 Berry, J.W., Beatty, J.A. & Proszynski, J. (1998). Salticidae of the Pacific Islands. III. Distribution of Seven Genera, with Description of Nineteen New Species and Two New Genera. Journal of Arachnology 26(2):149-189. PDF

Salticidae
Endemic fauna of Fiji
Spiders of Fiji
Spiders described in 1998